is a Japanese insurance company, headquartered in Tokyo.  The company was founded in 1888 and is, today, one of the oldest and largest insurers in Japan.

Asahi Mutual Life Insurance is a member of the Mizuho keiretsu.

References

External links
Asahi Mutual Life Insurance Company (in Japanese)

Mutual insurance companies
Financial services companies established in 1888
Mizuho Financial Group
Insurance companies based in Tokyo
Furukawa Group
Japanese companies established in 1888